The 1983 Senior League World Series took place from August 15–20 in Gary, Indiana, United States. Pingtung, Taiwan defeated Curaçao, Netherlands Antilles in the championship game.

Teams

Results

References

Senior League World Series
Senior League World Series
1983 in sports in Indiana